Vietnagone is a small genus of Asian sheet weavers native to southeastern Tibet and northern Vietnam. It was erected by A. V. Tanasevitch in 2019 for one newly described species and one transferred from Gongylidium. The name is a combination of "Vietnam" and the genus Erigone, and  it contains only two species: V. rugulosa and V. silvatica.

See also
 Gongylidium
 List of Linyphiidae species (Q–Z)

References

Further reading

Linyphiidae genera
Spiders of Asia